= Mohra Darogha =

Coordinates: 33°30′N 73°13′E

- Village
- Location within Pakistan
- Country: Pakistan
- Province: Punjab
- District: Rawalpindi
- Time zone: UTC+5 (PST)

Morah Darogha is a village in Rawalpindi district of the Punjab province of Pakistan.
